Chartered status  may refer to: 

Award of Chartered (Professional) status in a particular profession, commonly issued by British and Commonwealth Professional Societies worldwide.

The gaining of a Royal Charter